Sophie Anna Rebecca Scamps (born 15 March 1971) is an Australian independent politician, general practitioner, and former athlete. In the 2022 Australian federal election, she was elected as the Member for Mackellar in the Australian House of Representatives.

Biography
Scamps grew up in Turramurra, New South Wales. She attended Abbotsleigh school, noted for her achievements in athletics. She qualified for the 1992 Olympics as a middle distance runner.

Scamps studied Medicine at the University of Sydney graduating in 1995. Later, she received a Master of Public Health from University of New South Wales, and a master of Science with honours from the University of Oxford. 

She was a founder of the Our Blue Dot environmental movement, which campaigns for waste reduction and carbon neutrality. In 2020, using the "kitchen table conversations" model created by former Indi independent Cathy McGowan, Scamps and four like-minded locals created the 'Voices of Mackellar' group. The Voices of Mackellar is a non-partisan community group established to engage residents in the democratic process.

Backed by Climate 200, as well as a large grass-roots local campaign, Scamps announced her candidacy as an independent in December 2020. Scamps was one of the 23 independents who ran for the 2022 Australian federal election. Her campaign focused on the issues of climate, integrity and gender diversity. Scamps noted that her candidacy was triggered when she received a survey from the incumbent Jason Falinski which omitted climate change as an issue important to Mackellar residents.

Scamps lives in Avalon on Sydney's Northern Beaches, with her husband Adam Magro and three children and, for a time, a family of Ukrainian refugees. Her own surname is Belgian and pronounced 'Scomps'.

Media 
Scamps has been in various Australian media, including The Sydney Morning Herald, The Australian, The Guardian, and Women's Agenda. Her coverage has been focused on the need for action on climate change. She has been labelled as a part of the so-called 'teal wave', a movement of moderate independent candidates whose focus on climate change has challenged traditionally Coalition safe seats.

Running career
Scamps was a middle distance runner in her early life, and qualified for the Olympic games. She competed internationally for Australia, and was a member of the gold medal winning 4 x 400 m women's relay, at the World Junior Championships in 1990. The team set a new under 20 Australian Record, which is still standing.

Her personal bests include:

 400 m – 52.67s – Sydney, Australia (1991)
 800 m – 2:02:2 – Canberra 
 4 × 400 m relay – 3:30:38 – Deveti Septemvri Stadium, Plodiv (1990)

References 

Living people
1970 births
21st-century Australian politicians
Independent members of the Parliament of Australia
Members of the Australian House of Representatives for Mackellar
Politicians from Sydney
University of Sydney alumni
Australian female middle-distance runners
Australian general practitioners
Australian people of Belgian descent
Australian sportsperson-politicians
Australian women medical doctors
Members of the Australian House of Representatives
Athletes from Sydney
Sportswomen from New South Wales
Women members of the Australian House of Representatives
21st-century Australian women politicians